Pirgacha is an upazila of Rangpur District in the division of Rangpur, Bangladesh.

Geography
It has 52,432 households and total area 265.32 km2.
Tambulpur is one of the famous unions which is situated on the bank of River Burail.
Pirgacha upazila is situated at the south-east corner of Rangpur town.
Tambulpur is the largest union of Pirgacha Upazila. It is about 12 kilometers east–west and about 6 kilometers north–south. And Rahmatchar is the largest village under this union. It is situated at the very east side at River Tista which is the meeting points of Rangpur, Kurigram and Gaibandha Districts.

Demographics
As of the 2011 Bangladesh census, Pirgacha has a population of 329,573. Males constitute 50.59% of the population, and females 49.41%. This Upazila's eighteen up population is 125484. Pirgacha has an average literacy rate of 21.5% (7+ years), and the national average of 32.4% literate.

Administration
Pirgacha Upazila is divided into nine union parishad: Anandanagar, Chhaola, Itakumari, Kaikuri, Kalyani, Kandi, Parul, Pirgacha, and Tambulpur. The union parishads are subdivided into 170 mauzas and 170 villages.

Colleges
 Pirgachha Govt. College (Pirgacha)
 Itakumari Shibchandra Roy College (Pirgacha)
 Pirgachha Women's College (Pirgacha)
 Rahim Uddin Bharsa Women's College (Pirgacha)
 Karim Uddin Bharsa Women's College (Pirgacha)
 Devi Chowdhurani Degree College (Chowdhurani, Pirgacha)
 Tambulpur College ( Tambulpur, Pirgacha )
 Paotanahat College (Paotanahat, Pirgacha)
 Satdargah College (Satdargah, Pirgacha)
 Annadanagar College (Annandanagar, Pirgacha)
 Deuty High School & College

Two or three high schools and four Dakhil madrasha. Rahmatchar is one of the famous villages of this union. There are two primary schools and two madrasha in Rahmatchar. Dewanbari is the most famous in Rahmatchar even in the union.

See also
 Upazilas of Bangladesh
 Districts of Bangladesh
 Divisions of Bangladesh

References

Upazilas of Rangpur District